Victor Pablo (born August 8, 1970) is a retired Filipino professional basketball player in the Philippine Basketball Association.

Playing career

A former king Tamaraw at Far Eastern University, Pablo was the second overall pick in the 1993 PBA draft. He was drafted by Ginebra San Miguel but failed to reach an agreement with the Gins and was subsequently traded to Pepsi in exchange for center Manny Victorino. At Pepsi, he rejoined coach Derrick Pumaren, his former coach at Triple-V Foodmasters during his PBL days.

After two seasons with the Mega Bottlers, Pablo would be involved in two trades in the 1995 PBA season, first with Alvin Teng, whom San Miguel dealt to Pepsi to acquire Pablo and towards the end of the 1995 PBA Governors' Cup eliminations, he was traded by the Beermen to Formula Shell for Paul Alvarez.

In 1998, Pablo was one of the final cuts in coach Tim Cone's Philippine Centennial Team. Vic made up for the non-inclusion to the Asian Games squad by having an outstanding season with Formula Shell. He earned his first PBA championship in a six-year career when Shell won the season-ending Governors Cup.

He was traded to Mobiline Phone Pals for Mark Telan at the beginning of the new millennium. In 2003, finally free from injuries, Pablo stepped up big and helped the Phone Pals win their first title in the All-Filipino Cup Championship.

Pablo was later on traded to Barangay Ginebra Kings in 2008, where he finally got to play for the team that drafted him.  He won a championship ring for the Kings during the Fiesta Conference.  After his one season stint w/ Ginebra, he decided to call it quits.

Coaching career

Pablo later served as one of the assistant coaches for the FEU Tamaraws.

References

1970 births
Living people
Barangay Ginebra San Miguel players
Filipino men's basketball players
Philippine Basketball Association All-Stars
San Miguel Beermen players
Shell Turbo Chargers players
Small forwards
Basketball players from Manila
TNT Tropang Giga players
FEU Tamaraws basketball players
Barangay Ginebra San Miguel draft picks
FEU Tamaraws basketball coaches
Filipino men's basketball coaches